"Let Your Hair Down" is a song recorded by Canadian reggae fusion band Magic! for their debut studio album, Don't Kill the Magic (2014). It was written by Adam Messinger with group members Nasri Atweh and Alex Tanas, and was produced by Messinger, Atweh, Tanas and Magic! guitarist Mark Pellizzer. On October 7, 2014 the song was issued to contemporary hit radio by RCA Records as the third single from the album, and second to be released in the US.

Music video
A lyric video for "Let Your Hair Down" was uploaded to the band's official Vevo channel on August 20, 2014. The official music video, directed by David Rousseau, features the band on a beach at sunset and premiered October 31, 2014.

Chart performance

Weekly charts

Year-end chart

Release history

References

2014 songs
2014 singles
Magic! songs
RCA Records singles
Songs written by Nasri (musician)
Songs written by Adam Messinger